The Lost Prince is a British television drama about the life of Prince John – youngest child of Britain's King George V and Queen Mary – who died at the age of 13 in 1919.

A Talkback Thames production written and directed by Stephen Poliakoff, it was originally broadcast in January 2003. It won three Emmy Awards in 2005.

Plot
John had epileptic seizures and an autism-like developmental disorder, and the Royal Family tried to shelter him from public view; the script did not present the Royal Family as unsympathetic, instead showing how much this cost them emotionally (particularly John's mother, Queen Mary). Poliakoff explores the story of John, his relationship with his family and brother Prince George, the political events going on at the time (such as the fall of the House of Romanov in 1917) and the love and devotion of his nanny, Charlotte Bill (Lalla).

Episode One
A spellbound young Prince John gazes as his family attend an elaborate birthday party for his pampered and indulged grandmother Queen Alexandra in December 1908, held at Sandringham in Norfolk during the winter.

When summer arrives there is much excitement again as Tsar Nicholas II, Tsarina Alexandra, and their children, visit their relatives, the British royals, on the Isle of Wight. The Russians entrance Prince John with their exotic splendour. It is clear, even at this stage, that Johnnie, a charming and attractive boy, has an eccentric view of the world and is uninhibited in a way that is alien to his parents. His ailing grandfather, King Edward VII, loves him for his frankness. It is clear also that his nanny, Lalla, is reluctant to reveal the seriousness of his medical condition.

While the populace of the capital gaze into the night skies to catch a glimpse of an approaching comet, Johnnie's parents are called to Buckingham Palace to be by the King's deathbed.

During the funeral attended by many of the heads of state of Europe, including Kaiser Wilhelm of Germany, Johnnie has a serious epileptic seizure. Queen Mary, Johnnie's mother, summons doctors to examine him and their diagnosis confirms her and Lalla's worst fears. Lalla volunteers to look after Johnnie to prevent him being sent to an institution. The two of them are to be sent to Sandringham, where Johnnie is to be prevented from encountering anybody but the closest members of his family.

His sibling, Prince George, who has always treasured Johnnie, swears to protect him. Johnnie, now a few years older, is deprived of the company of any children and finds the schooling of his tutor, Hansell, unfathomable. Although lonely, he always takes an optimistic view of life. Then one day, to the acute embarrassment of King George V and Queen Mary, he speaks his mind at a tea party held for Prime Minister H. H. Asquith and his Chancellor of the Exchequer, Lloyd George.

Johnnie is brought to London to be re-examined by the doctors. During his stay he is taken by his brother George up to the minstrel's gallery looking down on the banqueting hall of Buckingham Palace, to observe a grand state occasion. The assembled dignitaries are chattering feverishly about the poise with which the Queen has dealt with the intrusion of a suffragette, who has confronted the Queen to demand her support for women's suffrage.

During the banquet Asquith and Lloyd George are called back to Downing Street to receive the news that is to prove to be the catalyst for the start of the First World War.

The following morning Johnnie receives a rare meeting with his father King George, who shows him his treasured stamp collection. Johnnie is more interested in his father's pet parrot, Charlotte. Suddenly, father and son are interrupted by the King's Private Secretary, Lord Stamfordham, who has come to relay the news of the assassination of Archduke Franz Ferdinand in Sarajevo. Realising that the news has been withheld from him, the King erupts in fury. Unnoticed by the adults, Johnnie pursues Charlotte, as the terrified bird flies away into the bowels of the building. The Queen, Lalla and George go searching for Johnnie and his mother is shocked when she sees, for the first time, one of Johnnie's debilitating fits. In the midst of scurrying officials gathering for urgent diplomatic meetings, Johnnie is secreted away from the Palace and back to the isolation of Sandringham.

Episode Two
Prince George witnesses the brinkmanship of the Allies in the face of the belligerent posture taken by the Central Powers, led by Germany. Much to the surprise of all concerned, the weak and vacillating Tsar Nicholas of Russia mobilises his troops and plunges Europe into a world war. Against his wishes, George is sent to the harsh Naval College where his rebellious nature leads him to question propaganda about the cruelty of the German armed forces.

Such propaganda, combined with the disastrous consequences of the conflict on the battlefields of Flanders and France, turns the public's attention to the German ancestry of the British royal family. The trauma of war is even felt by Johnnie, Lalla and their household, who are forced to live in increased isolation in Wood Farm, on the fringes of the Sandringham estate. Prince George is determined to maintain contact with Lalla and his brother. He arrives to relay the news that the family is to change its name to Windsor, and that the Tsar of Russia has abdicated and is to be exiled to Britain by the Bolshevik revolutionaries.

George is alarmed at the reaction of his own subjects and persuades Stamfordham to press Lloyd George, who is now Prime Minister, to rescind the invitation to the Tsar. Johnnie dreams innocently of his Russian cousins coming to live with him and is being prepared by Lalla to give a recital to his parents. King George and Queen Mary are traumatised by what follows – the execution of the Romanovs. Weighed down by the effects of the conflagration that has enveloped Europe, they find consolation when their son Johnnie dies in his unbounded optimism and unalloyed love of life.

Cast
Daniel Williams – Prince "Johnnie" John (younger)
Matthew Thomas – Prince John (older)
Brock Everitt-Elwick – Prince George (younger)
 Rollo Weeks – Prince George (older)
 Samuel Page – Tsarevich Alexei (younger)
Kostya Severov  – Tsarevich Alexei (older)
 Miranda Richardson – Queen Mary
Mary Nighy  – Princess Mary
 Gina McKee – Lalla
 Tom Hollander – King George V
 Bill Nighy – Arthur Bigge, 1st Baron Stamfordham
 Bibi Andersson – Queen Alexandra
 Ron Cook – David Lloyd George
Roz McCutcheon – Princess Mary Adelaide
 Frank Finlay – H. H. Asquith
 John Sessions – Henry Hansell
 Michael Gambon – King Edward VII
David Barrass – Kaiser Wilhelm II
Ivan Marevich – Tsar Nicholas II
 Ingeborga Dapkūnaitė – Tsarina Alexandra Feodorovna
Vanessa Ackerman – Grand Duchess Olga
Holly Boyd – Grand Duchess Tatiana
Nastya Razduhova – Grand Duchess Maria
Algina Lipskis – Grand Duchess Anastasia

Reception
The drama achieved a high viewing figure and much praise, was released on VHS and DVD, and was repeated on BBC One in January 2004.

Accolades

Notes

References

Further reading

External links
 Official BBC site
 Interview with the writer/director, Stephen Poliakoff
 
 
 PBS site for The Lost Prince
 PBS music notes for The Lost Prince
 Story synopses for The Lost Prince

BBC television royalty dramas
Anti-war films about World War I
Primetime Emmy Award for Outstanding Miniseries winners
Primetime Emmy Award-winning television series
2003 television films
2003 films
Cultural depictions of David Lloyd George
Cultural depictions of Edward VII
Cultural depictions of George V
Cultural depictions of Wilhelm II
Cultural depictions of Nicholas II of Russia
Cultural depictions of Grand Duchess Anastasia Nikolaevna of Russia